The McLaren Speedtail is a limited-production hybrid sports car manufactured by McLaren Automotive, revealed on October 26, 2018. This car is the fourth edition in the McLaren Ultimate Series, after the Senna, the P1, and the F1. The car is also part of the 18 new cars or derivatives that McLaren will launch as part of its Track22 business plan.

Specifications 
The Speedtail is powered by a modified M840T from the 720S and a hybrid powertrain to generate . The Speedtail uses a carbon fibre monocoque, with the passenger seats integrated into the chassis, as well as dihedral doors like other McLaren models.

Performance 

Technology 
The car recharges its hybrid battery while driving, though a wireless charging pad is included with the car, trickle-charging it when not in use.

The Speedtail is fitted with electrochromic glass, which darkens at the push of a button, eliminating the need for sun visors and also incorporates LED lights in the interior. Similarly, the Speedtail does not feature door mirrors, instead using HD cameras mounted on the front guards that pop out when the ignition is turned on, and retract inside when the "Velocity mode" is activated, which reduces overall drag and optimizes overall performance. The front wheels feature carbon fibre static covers to further reduce drag. On the exterior, it features hydraulically actuated active rear aerodynamic control surfaces, which are formed in flexible carbon fibre and are an integral part of the rear clamshell.

Interior 
The Speedtail has a 3-seat layout, similar to the preceding F1, which has the driver sitting at the centre of the car, and slightly forward of the two passenger seats. On the original F1, this layout was used to provide better visibility than a conventional seating layout. The interior of the Speedtail features "directional leather finish" which McLaren says “makes it easy to slide into the seat but then subtly holds the occupant in place while they drive.” and is strong enough that it can be used in place of carpet on the floor of the Speedtail. It also features "Titanium Deposition Carbon Fibre", which is when "a micron-thin layer of titanium is fused directly onto the weave and becomes an integral part of the carbon fibre’s construction.", as well as Thin-Ply Technology Carbon Fibre (TPT), consisting of countless 30 micron thick layers of carbon fibre. The company also offers bespoke luggage for Speedtail owners, a practice implemented when the F1 went on sale.

Production 
Testing was done in Florida at the Kennedy Space Center at the Johnny Bohmer Proving Grounds. The shuttle landing runway was used for the tests. It was also tested on tracks in Germany, Spain and Italy.

In November 2018, McLaren planned to build 106 examples of the Speedtail, all of which have already been sold, at an MSRP of around £2.1 million. Due in part to its use of cameras in place of side mirrors and no side-mounted airbags, the Speedtail does not meet Federal Motor Vehicle Safety Standards (FMVSS) in the United States, even though around 35% of the total cars were bought by American buyers. A spokeswoman for the company stated that the car may be legal, pending approval by the NHTSA, to be imported into the U.S. under the “Show or Display” law, which exempts cars that are “historically or technologically significant" from FMVSS, but imposes a mileage limit of 2,500 miles in a 12-month period and registration of the vehicle with the DOT. McLaren has made it clear that they will not offer assistance with importing or registering the Speedtail in the U.S.

Production of the McLaren Speedtail commenced in the United Kingdom after high-speed testing was completed by December 2019. The first deliveries, 106 cars, were slated for February 2020 to Woking, England.

Gallery

See also 

 List of production cars by power output

References

External links 

 Official product page

Speedtail
Cars introduced in 2018
Sports cars
Flagship vehicles
Coupés
Hybrid electric cars
Rear mid-engine, rear-wheel-drive vehicles
Cars with a centre driving position
2020s cars